A number of steamships were named Santa Isabel, including –

, a German collier scuttled in 1914 during the Battle of the Falkland Islands.
, a British cargo ship built by Dunlop, Bremner & Co. Captured and sunk by U-153 in 1918.
, an American cargo ship in service 1931–39
, a Spanish cargo liner which sank in a storm in 1921
, an American cargo ship sold in 1921 to Spain and which burnt and sank that year as Iquique.
. An American Type C2 cargo ship in service 1939–41 and 1942–43.

Ship names